Lavangi is a rāgam (musical scale) of Carnatic music (South Indian classical music).

It is a janya rāgam (derived scale) of the 8th Melakarta rāgam Hanumatodi. M. Balamuralikrishna is credited with introducing it into Carnatic music and using this scale first for compositions.
His most popular kriti in this ragam is 'Omkaaraakarini'.

Scale

The Lavangi scale contains four swarams:

Arohana : 
Avarohana :

Origin
The ragam Lavangi is derived from the Sanskrit word 'Lavang' meaning clove. Through the notion of a clove having four sectors, M. Balamuralikrishna built the raga to have 4 swaras, excluding the low sadharna as it is generic.

Compositions

Film Songs

Language:Tamil

Notes

References

Janya ragas